DeJuan R. Tribble (born April 13, 1985) is a former American football cornerback. He was drafted by the San Diego Chargers in the sixth round of the 2008 NFL Draft. He played college football at Boston College. During his time as an Eagle he recorded 15 interceptions, as well as 3 touchdowns.

Tribble also played for the Florida Tuskers and Omaha Nighthawks.

Professional career

Florida Tuskers
Tribble was drafted by the Florida Tuskers of the United Football League in the UFL Premiere Season Draft in 2009. He signed with the team on September 9.

References

External links
 Just Sports Stats
 Boston College Eagles bio

1985 births
Living people
American football cornerbacks
Boston College Eagles football players
San Diego Chargers players
Florida Tuskers players
Omaha Nighthawks players
Players of American football from Cincinnati